Tegid may refer to:

 Ioan Tegid (1792-1852), Welsh clergyman and bard
 Tegid Foel, a character in Welsh mythology
 Llyn Tegid, the Welsh name for Bala Lake